The Islamabad Leopards was a domestic T20 and List A cricket team, based in Islamabad, Pakistan. The team was established in 2004.

Notable players

Shoaib Akhtar
Umer Gul
Iftikhar Anjum
Bazid Khan
Shan Masood
Babar Azam
Imad Wasim

See also
 Pakistan Super League

References

External links
Twenty 20 Record page for Islamabad Leopards
Cricketarchive page for Islamabad Leopards

Cricket clubs established in 2004
2004 establishments in Pakistan
Cricket teams in Pakistan
Leopards